Suburban Hostage was an American punk rock band from Denver, Colorado, United States, formed in 2004.    The current lineup consists of Ross Swirling (vocals), Felipe Patino (guitar), Bret Ahroon (bass guitar,  back-up vocals), Cody Bennett (guitar,  back-up vocals),  and Ruben Patino (drums).  The band is currently recording with Ridiculous Records an independent punk rock record label based in Denver.  Suburban Hostage has released one studio album.

History
In 1998, two young brothers named Felipe and Ruben moved to Colorado from their native Lima, Peru to pursue their musical dreams in The United States.  Before leaving Peru, Ruben had been playing in a band named Futuro Incierto, well known throughout Latin America for their smooth hard-core punk rock music.  Early in 2004 the brothers met a young guitarist named T.J. Petty and formed a hardcore punk rock band named Suburban Hostage.
The band began playing small shows Denver bars and clubs and gaining some local notoriety. In 2005, Ross Swirling left the band Action Shot where he played Alto Sax to become the lead singer of Suburban Hostage.  At the same time, Felipe and Ruben asked a young bass guitar player by the name of Bret Ahroon to joint the band.  He agreed, and the line-up was set to record the band's first studio album.

In 2006, the band began work on A Sorry State, its first studio album.  It was recorded entirely in a home-made studio located in the basement of Ruben's house.  Knowing the album needed some "fine touches" put on it before release, Bret convinced the band to have the album mixed and mastered at The Blasting Room, a famous punk rock recording studio located in Fort Collins, Colorado and owned by Descendents drummer, Bill Stevenson.

In 2008, Felipe took a break from the band and from Denver for school related reasons.  This left Suburban Hostage without a lead guitarist at almost the same time a tour was booked in support of A Sorry State.  The band was rescued by highly talented Berklee grad and guitar teacher, Jeff Solohub.  It was understood that he would only be filling in for Felipe while the band was on tour.  During the summer of 2008 Suburban Hostage played a slew of shows around Colorado and the West Coast with Jeff in the lineup and it was decided that, when Felipe returned, he would be a permanent member.  Shortly after the decision to add Jeff to the band, T.J. left to start a new band called “The Sunday Strippers.”

Growing reputation
Suburban Hostage dove head first into the Denver punk rock scene before ever recording a proper album, relying entirely on their stunning live show, along with T-shirt and ticket sales, to keep growing as a band.  Their unique hard-core punk rock style and inviting stage presence caught the attention of local promoters and fans alike.  In a short amount of time, they started sharing stages around Denver with local favorites like Red Stinger, Frontside Five, and Boldtype as well as national touring acts such as; A Wilhelm Scream, The Unseen, Ignite, Teenage Bottlerocket, Agent Orange and Only Crime.  The band has continued working on a lot of new music while songs from their upcoming EP Unified Theory of Critical Thinking can be heard in their live sets.

A Sorry State (2006)
A Sorry State was recorded over the course of 2006 and was tracked in the basement of drummer Ruben Patino's house.  The album was mixed and mastered by Andrew Berlin at The Blasting Room in Fort Collins Colorado.  A Sorry State became available in stores and the iTunes Music Store the same month. Current distribution of this album is being handled by Ridiculous Records.

Unified Theory of Critical Thinking (2009)
Recording began on a follow up to A Sorry State in early 2009 at The Blasting Room in Fort Collins, Colorado where Felipe Patino found work upon returning from school in Florida.  The EP titled; Unified Theory of Critical Thinking is the first to feature the band's current lineup on a recorded album.  Felipe Patino tracked and mixed the new EP which the band then brought to Jason Livermore for mastering. Unified Theory of Critical Thinking has been set for a September, 2009 release date and is slated to be the first release from Ridiculous Records.

Ridiculous Records
After years of being free of major record labels and independent record labels alike, Ross Swirling, singer for Suburban Hostage, made a decision to start his own label.  Ridiculous Records, an LLC, was set up initially to release the forthcoming Suburban Hostage EP and hopes to help bolster the Denver music scene by working with other local bands and artists.

There has been favorable reaction from musicians and fans alike to the news of a new record label in Denver.  Ross is following in the footsteps of other musicians turned label owners such as Fat Mike from Fat Wreck Chords, Joe Sib and Bill Armstrong from Side One Dummy Records, and Mike Park from Asian Man Records who have successfully started their own labels and supported the Punk Rock community by releasing quality albums from bands they enjoy.

Influences
Suburban Hostage is strongly influenced by the music of Propagandhi, NOFX, Minor Threat and Bad Religion.

Current members
Ross Swirling - Vocals
Felipe Patino - Lead Guitar
Bret Ahroon - Bass Guitar, Back-up Vocals
Cody Bennett - Guitar, Back-up Vocals
Ruben Patino - Drums

Former members
Jeff Solohub - Guitar, Back-up Vocals
T.J. Petty - Guitar, Back-up Vocals

Discography
Sorry State (2007)
Unified Theory of Critical Thinking (EP) (September, 2009)

References
Official Suburban Hostage Website
Pure Volume
Colorado Daily
Denver Decider
Soda Jerk Presents

Punk rock groups from Colorado
Musical groups established in 2004